Jean or Jehan Petit, in Latin Johannes Parvus, was a printer, publisher and bookseller in Paris.
From 1493 to 1530 he printed about one tenth of all publications in Paris, more than ten thousand volumes.

Petit was one of the four major booksellers at the University of Paris and greatly contributed to the spread of early Renaissance Humanism in Paris. He published a large number of original editions. Among his collaborators were Robert Estienne and Josse Bade. Petit was an example of a prosperous early printer.

Published works
Euangelia Cum Commentariis Reverendissimi Domini Domini Thomae de Vio.
Gringor, Pierre. Heures de Nostre Dame, c 1527
Beroaldo, Phillipo. On the Symbols of Pythagorus
Deguilville. Le romant de trois pelerinaiges

Today his works are held in museums and private collections.

References 

Year of birth missing
French printers
16th-century French people